Dardərə (also Dardera and Dardere) is a village in the Dashkasan Rayon of Azerbaijan.  The village forms part of the municipality of Əhmədli.

References 

Populated places in Dashkasan District